In mathematics, a topological space  is said to be a Baire space if countable unions of closed sets with empty interior also have empty interior.
According to the Baire category theorem, compact Hausdorff spaces and complete metric spaces are examples of Baire spaces.
The Baire category theorem combined with the properties of Baire spaces has numerous applications in topology, geometry, analysis, in particular functional analysis. For more motivation and applications, see the article Baire category theorem.  The current article focuses more on characterizations and basic properties of Baire spaces per se.

Bourbaki introduced the term "Baire space" in honor of René Baire, who investigated the Baire category theorem in the context of Euclidean space  in his 1899 thesis.

Definition 

The definition that follows is based on the notions of meagre (or first category) set (namely, a set that is a countable union of sets whose closure has empty interior) and nonmeagre (or second category) set (namely, a set that is not meagre).  See the corresponding article for details.

A topological space  is called a Baire space if it satisfies any of the following equivalent conditions:

 Every countable intersection of dense open sets is dense.
 Every countable union of closed sets with empty interior has empty interior.
 Every meagre set has empty interior.
 Every nonempty open set is nonmeagre.
 Every comeagre set is dense.
 Whenever a countable union of closed sets has an interior point, at least one of the closed sets has an interior point.

Baire category theorem 

The Baire category theorem gives sufficient conditions for a topological space to be a Baire space.

 (BCT1) Every complete pseudometric space is a Baire space.  In particular, every completely metrizable topological space is a Baire space.
 (BCT2) Every locally compact regular space is a Baire space.  In particular, every locally compact Hausdorff space is a Baire space.

BCT1 shows that the following are Baire spaces:
 The space  of real numbers.
 The space of irrational numbers, which is homeomorphic to the Baire space  of set theory.
 Every Polish space.

BCT2 shows that the following are Baire spaces:
 Every compact Hausdorff space; for example, the Cantor set (or Cantor space).
 Every manifold, even if it is not paracompact (hence not metrizable), like the long line.

One should note however that there are plenty of spaces that are Baire spaces without satisfying the conditions of the Baire category theorem, as shown in the Examples section below.

Properties 

 Every nonempty Baire space is nonmeagre.  In terms of countable intersections of dense open sets, being a Baire space is equivalent to such intersections being dense, while being a nonmeagre space is equivalent to the weaker condition that such intersections are nonempty.
 Every open subspace of a Baire space is a Baire space.
 Every dense Gδ set in a Baire space is a Baire space.  The result need not hold if the Gδ set is not dense.  See the Examples section.
 Every comeagre set in a Baire space is a Baire space.
 A subset of a Baire space is comeagre if and only if it contains a dense Gδ set.
 A closed subspace of a Baire space need not be Baire.  See the Examples section.
 If a space contains a dense subspace that is Baire, it is also a Baire space.
 A space that is locally Baire, in the sense that each point has a neighborhood that is a Baire space, is a Baire space.
 Every topological sum of Baire spaces is Baire.
 The product of two Baire spaces is not necessarily Baire.
 An arbitrary product of complete metric spaces is Baire.
 Every locally compact sober space is a Baire space.
 Every finite topological space is a Baire space (because a finite space has only finitely many open sets and the intersection of two open dense sets is an open dense set).
 A topological vector space is a Baire space if and only if it is nonmeagre, which happens if and only if every closed balanced absorbing subset has non-empty interior.

Examples 
 The empty space is a Baire space.  It is the only space that is both Baire and meagre.
 The space  of real numbers with the usual topology is a Baire space.
 The space  of rational numbers (with the topology induced from ) is not a Baire space, since it is meagre.
 The space of irrational numbers (with the topology induced from ) is a Baire space, since it is comeagre in 
 The space  (with the topology induced from ) is nonmeagre, but not Baire.  There are several ways to see it is not Baire: for example because the subset  is comeagre but not dense; or because the nonempty subset  is open and meagre.
 Similarly, the space  is not Baire.  It is nonmeagre since  is an isolated point.

The following are examples of Baire spaces for which the Baire category theorem does not apply, because these spaces are not locally compact and not completely metrizable:
 The Sorgenfrey line.
 The Sorgenfrey plane.
 The Niemytzki plane.
The space  is not locally compact and not completely metrizable. Since in a metric space closed sets are Gδ sets, this also shows that in general Gδ sets in a Baire space need not be Baire.

Algebraic varieties with the Zariski topology are Baire spaces. An example is the affine space  consisting of the set  of -tuples of complex numbers, together with the topology whose closed sets are the vanishing sets of polynomials

See also

Notes

References

External links 

 Encyclopaedia of Mathematics article on Baire space
 Encyclopaedia of Mathematics article on Baire theorem

General topology
Functional analysis
Properties of topological spaces